"Uza" (stylized in Japanese as "UZA", meaning "Annoying" and pronounced "oo-zah") is the 28th major single by the Japanese female idol group AKB48, released in Japan on October 31, 2012.

Background 
The single was first announced on Yasushi Akimoto's Google+ and the title song premiered live on September 18, 2012, at the AKB48's rock-paper-scissors tournament at Nippon Budokan. This is also the first single without ace Maeda Atsuko, and this is also the first senbatsu participation of Sakura Miyawaki.

Mayu Watanabe was originally one of the centers, along with Jurina Matsui, however due to heavy choreography involved in this song, Yuko Oshima, a more experienced dancer, later replaced Watanabe's center position.

It was released in four versions: Type-A, Type-K, Type-B, and Theater Edition.

The music video for the title song was directed by Joseph Kahn, the director of the music video for "Gingham Check".

Track listing

Type-A

Type-K

Type-B

Theater Edition

Members

"Uza" 
Center: Yūko Ōshima, Jurina Matsui.
 Team A: Haruna Kojima, Mariko Shinoda, Minami Takahashi
 Team K: Tomomi Itano, Yūko Ōshima, Minami Minegishi, Yui Yokoyama
 Team B: Yuki Kashiwagi, Mayu Watanabe
 Team 4: Haruka Shimazaki
 SKE48 Team S / AKB48 Team K: Jurina Matsui
 SKE48 Team S: Rena Matsui
 NMB48 Team N / AKB48 Team B: Miyuki Watanabe
 NMB48 Team N: Sayaka Yamamoto
 HKT48 Team H: Rino Sashihara, Sakura Miyawaki

"Tsugi no Season" 
The song is performed by Under Girls.
Center: Rina Kawaei
 Team 4: Miori Ichikawa, Anna Iriyama, Karen Iwata, Rena Katō, Rina Kawaei, Juri Takahashi, Miyu Takeuchi, Yūka Tano, Mariya Nagao
 Promoted Kenkyūsei: Ryoka Oshima, Tomu Muto
 SKE48 Team S: Yuria Kizaki
 SKE48 Team KII: Manatsu Mukaida
 SKE48 Team E: Kanon Kimoto
 NMB48 Team N: Nana Yamada
 HKT48 Team H: Haruka Kodama

"Kodoku na Hoshizora" 
 New Team A: Karen Iwata, Rina Izuta, Anna Iriyama, Ryōka Ōshima, Tomomi Kasai, Rina Kawaei, Ayaka Kikuchi, Riho Kotani, Marina Kobayashi, Sumire Satō, Natsuki Satō, Mariko Shinoda, Juri Takahashi, Minami Takahashi, Yūka Tano, Tomomi Nakatsuka, Shiori Nakamata, Moeno Nitō, Sakiko Matsui, Ayaka Morikawa, Yui Yokoyama, Mayu Watanabe

"Scrap & Build" 
 New Team K: Sayaka Akimoto, Maria Abe, Tomomi Itano, Yūko Ōshima, Mayumi Uchida, Rie Kitahara, Asuka Kuramochi, Kana Kobayashi, Amina Satō, Haruka Shimada, Shihori Suzuki, Rina Chikano, Chisato Nakata, Sayaka Nakaya, Mariya Nagao, Nana Fujita, Ami Maeda, Yuka Masuda, Jurina Matsui, Natsumi Matsubara, Kaoru Mitsumune, Miho Miyazaki, Tomu Muto

"Seigi no Mikata ja Nai Hero" 
 New Team B: Anna Ishida, Haruka Ishida, Miori Ichikawa, Misaki Iwasa, Ayaka Umeda, Mina Ōba, Shizuka Ōya, Yuki Kashiwagi, Haruka Katayama, Rena Katō, Natsuki Kojima, Haruna Kojima, Mika Komori, Haruka Shimazaki, Miyu Takeuchi, Miku Tanabe, Mariko Nakamura, Wakana Natori, Misato Nonaka, Reina Fujie, Minami Minegishi, Suzuran Yamauchi, Miyuki Watanabe

"Otona e no Michi" 
The song is performed by kenkyūsei (trainees).

Aigasa Moe, Iwatate Saho, Uchiyama Natsuki, Umeta Ayano, Omori Miyuu, Okada Ayaka, Okada Nana, Kitazawa Saki, Kojima Mako, Saeed Yokota Erena, Sasaki Yukari, Shinozaki Ayana, Takashima Yurina, Nishino Miki, Hashimoto Hikari, Hirata Rina, Maeda Mitsuki, Murayama Yuiri, Mogi Shinobu

charts

Oricon

G-music (Taiwan)

References

External links 
 King Records profiles
 Type-A First Press Limited Edition
 Type-A Regular Edition
 Type-K First Press Limited Edition
 Type-K Regular Edition
 Type-B First Press Limited Edition
 Type-B Regular Edition
 Theater Edition

2012 singles
AKB48 songs
Music videos directed by Joseph Kahn
Songs with lyrics by Yasushi Akimoto
Oricon Weekly number-one singles
Billboard Japan Hot 100 number-one singles
King Records (Japan) singles
2012 songs